Carolina, also known as Bowlands or Bolands, is an unincorporated community located in Itawamba County, Mississippi.

History
Carolina was first settled in 1833 and named for North Carolina and South Carolina, the original settlers' home states. 
The community was once home to a two-story school building.

A post office operated under the name Bolands from 1841 to 1905.

Notable person
 John E. Rankin, member of the United States House of Representatives from 1921 to 1953

References

Unincorporated communities in Itawamba County, Mississippi
Unincorporated communities in Mississippi